Esti HaMekho'eret (lit. The Ugly Esti) is an Israeli television comedy-drama series starring Riki Blich. The series premiered on 3 July 2003 on Channel 2 in Israel and was created by Shlomo Moshiah.

This series is based on the Mexican telenovela El amor no es como lo pintan, despite reports that it is based on the Colombian novela Yo soy Betty, la fea. A report to the relevant stockholders of Dori Media shows that the company was threatened with a lawsuit because of their show's similarities to Betty la fea. Because of potential legal action, the show's premise was changed, as was its title, "Elvis, Rosenthal, VeHaIsha Hamistorit" .

Cast

References

2003 Israeli television series debuts
2006 Israeli television series endings
Comedy-drama television series
Fashion-themed television series
Israeli drama television series
Channel 2 (Israeli TV channel) original programming
2000s Israeli television series
Yo soy Betty, la fea